Castellazzo may refer to:

Castellazzo family, who settled at the beginning of the sixteenth century in Cairo

Places
Castellazzo Bormida in the Province of Alessandria, Piedmont
 Castellazzo di Bollate, within the municipal boundaries of the commune of Bollate in the Province of Milan, Lombardy
Castellazzo Novarese in the Province of Novara, Piedmont